Center Township is one of twelve townships in Buchanan County, Missouri, USA.  As of the 2010 census, its population was 3,049.

Center Township was established in 1841, and named for its location near the geographical center of Buchanan County.

Geography
It contains five cemeteries: Feuquay, New King Hill, Old Sparta, Parker and Pleasant Ridge.

References

External links
 US-Counties.com
 City-Data.com
 USGS Geographic Names Information System (GNIS)

Townships in Buchanan County, Missouri
Townships in Missouri